Tang Haochen (born 21 February 1994) is a former tennis player from China.

Tang has won two singles and four doubles titles on the ITF Circuit. On 15 December 2014, she reached her best singles ranking of world No. 371. On 15 July 2013, she peaked at No. 211 in the doubles rankings.

Playing for China Fed Cup team, Tang has accumulated a win–loss record of 7–7.

She qualified for a place in the main draw of the singles event for the 2014 Australian Open when she won the Asia-Pacific Australian Open Wildcard Playoff, defeating Risa Ozaki in the final, and was drawn against 30th seed Eugenie Bouchard, with the Canadian going through in straight sets.

ITF Circuit finals

Singles: 6 (2 titles, 4 runner-ups)

Doubles: 9 (4 titles, 5 runner-ups)

Junior Grand Slam finals

Girls' doubles

References

External links
 
 
 

1994 births
Living people
People from Zhengzhou
Chinese female tennis players
Tennis players at the 2010 Summer Youth Olympics
Tennis players from Henan
Youth Olympic gold medalists for China
21st-century Chinese women